Welcome to Poppy's is the fourth studio album by the band Fun Lovin' Criminals. It was released on September 9, 2003.

Track listing
 "Too Hot" - 3:16
 "Stray Bullet" - 2:47
 "Living on the Streets" - 3:45
 "Lost It All" - 3:01
 "Friday Night" - 4:18
 "You Got a Problem" - 2:56
 "Running for Cover" - 4:21
 "Take Me Back" - 3:32
 "What Had Happened?" - 4:27
 "Got Our Love" - 4:02
 "This Sick World" - 4:10
 "Steak Knife" - 3:31
 "Beautiful" - 4:28
 "Baby" - 3:20
 "You Just Can't Have It All" - 2:44

Singles
2003 "Too Hot" #61 UK
2004 "Beautiful" #132 UK

References

Fun Lovin' Criminals albums
2003 albums
Sanctuary Records albums